Sârbii-Măgura is a commune in Olt County, Muntenia, Romania. It is composed of a single village, Vitănești. This was part of Optași-Măgura Commune until 2004, when it was split off.

References

Communes in Olt County
Localities in Muntenia